Michael Madison (born October 15, 1977) is an American convicted serial killer and sex offender from East Cleveland, Ohio who is known to have committed the murders of at least three women over a nine-month period in 2012 and 2013. He was arrested and charged with the crimes in 2013 and in 2016, he was sentenced to death. Madison is currently being held on death row.

Early life
Madison was born on October 15, 1977, to Diane Madison and John Baldwin, the product of an accidental pregnancy. However, Baldwin has denied that he was the father and had no contact with Madison.

Madison had a severely abusive mother. His mother's boyfriends also abused him. He would later admit that he had mixed feelings over his mother's death.

Arrest
On July 19, 2013, police responded to reports of a foul odor, investigated a garage leased to Madison, and discovered a decomposing body lying inside. Two more bodies were found the following day – one in a backyard and the other in the basement of a vacant house. After obtaining a search warrant, police entered Madison's apartment and found "further evidence of decomposition." After a brief standoff with police at his mother's house, Madison was taken into custody without incident.

The victims were identified as:

Shetisha Sheeley, 28, who had been missing since September 2012.
Angela Deskins, 38, a resident of Cleveland who was reported missing in June 2013.
Shirellda Helen Terry, 18, was last seen July 10, 2013, leaving a Cleveland Elementary School where she had a summer job.

On July 22, 2013, Madison was charged with three counts of aggravated murder. His bail was set at six million dollars, and he also waived his right to a preliminary hearing.

Trial and conviction
On October 31, 2013, Madison's attorney David Grant entered a not guilty plea to an updated indictment that included sexually motivated aggravated murder charges; prosecutors had announced that they were now seeking the death penalty, a move his attorney had tried to prevent but had expected. The 14-count updated indictment includes two counts each of aggravated murder for each victim, three counts of kidnapping, three counts of gross abuse of a corpse, one count of rape, and one count of weapons possession by an ex-convict. He had originally been registered as a sex offender in 2002 after serving four years for an attempted rape conviction, having had previous drug convictions in 2000 and 2001.

Madison's trial began on April 4, 2016. On May 5, 2016, Madison was found guilty in the murders of Shirellda Terry, Shetisha Sheeley and Angela Deskins. The jury spent less than one day deliberating before returning a guilty verdict on all 13 counts. Madison told the court he planned to appeal to the Ohio Supreme Court. On May 20, 2016, the jury recommended that Madison should be sentenced to death. On June 2, 2016, Cuyahoga Common Pleas Judge Nancy R. McDonnell sentenced Madison to death. During the sentencing, Madison was seen smirking. The smirking caused Van Terry, the father of the victim, Shirellda Terry, to lunge at Madison in anger over his daughter's murder. Terry was released without charges.

The Ohio Supreme Court voted unanimously to uphold the death sentence for Madison on July 21, 2020.

Mother's killing
Three years after his conviction, Madison's mother, Diane Madison, was killed at her home on June 22, 2019. She died from multiple stab wounds. Three of her grandchildren were also injured in the attack. Her grandson, 18-year old Jalen Plummer was charged with his grandmother's murder and three counts of attempted murder. He pled guilty to all charges and was sentenced in June 2021 to life in prison with the possibility of parole after 30 years.

See also 
 List of death row inmates in the United States
 List of serial killers in the United States

References

1977 births
African-American people
American people convicted of attempted rape
American people convicted of murder
American people convicted of rape
American prisoners sentenced to death
American rapists
American serial killers
Crimes in Cleveland
Living people
Male serial killers
Murder in Ohio
Necrophiles
People convicted of murder by Ohio
People from East Cleveland, Ohio
Prisoners sentenced to death by Ohio
Violence against women in the United States